Polski Fiat is an indie rock band based in Boston, Massachusetts named after the automobile brand of the same name. The band meshes electronica and rock and roll music in a genre it calls "Science Rock."

On Polski Fiat's website the band describes their influences as "their scatological ramblings and adventures across the globe, where they picked up a taste for motorcade rock melodies, engineering electronica, prankish metaphysics, environmental punk, and theoretical multivariate differential poetry, interspersed with everyday beer & moral philosophy, and unaverage ordinary beautiful girls."

Most of the band's shows are in Cambridge or Somerville, Massachusetts, though they have been known to play in New York City and other locations along the east coast.

The band's 2004 album, The Luddite Spy was reviewed by the Boston rock magazine The Noise: "The Luddite Spy achieves what few bands are able to do successfully; the skillful use of music, lyrics, and the nuances of the vocals and instrumentation work comprehensively to convey specific thoughts or feelings. This stuff is unexpectedly addictive."

List of Albums 

 Untitled debut album (2003)
 The Luddite Spy (2004)
 Phylogeny (2007)

External links
Official website

Indie rock musical groups from Massachusetts
Musical groups from Boston